Derbyshire County Cricket Club in 1967 was the  cricket season when the English club Derbyshire had been playing for ninety-six years. It was their sixty-third  season in the County Championship and they won five championship  matches and lost five to finish sixth in the County Championship. In  the Gillette Cup, Derbyshire were knocked out in their first match which was in the second round of the competition.

1967 season

Derbyshire played 28 games in the County Championship, one match against the touring Indians and one match against Cambridge University.  They won six first class matches, lost six matches and drew eighteen matches. They lost their only match in the Gillette Cup. Derek Morgan was  captain. David Smith scored most runs. Harold Rhodes took most wickets for the club.

There were two new players in the Derbyshire team. GR Stephenson  played for two years before moving to Hampshire and CP Marks occasional matches over two years.

Matches

First Class

Gillette Cup

Statistics

Competition batting averages

Competition bowling averages

Wicket Keeping
Bob Taylor 
County Championship Catches  56, Stumping  4 
Gillette Cup Catches 0, Stumping 0
Bob Stephenson
County Championship Catches  7, Stumping 2

See also
Derbyshire County Cricket Club seasons
1967 English cricket season

References

1967 in English cricket
Derbyshire County Cricket Club seasons